Filipeștii may refer to two communes in Prahova County, Romania:

Filipeștii de Pădure
Filipeștii de Târg

See also
Filipești